Until 2009 the districts of Latvia, introduced in 1949 by the Soviet occupation authorities to supersede counties, were divided into 77 cities, 10 amalgamated municipalities, 24 rural territories and 475 parishes.

For the new administrative divisions from 1 July 2021, see Administrative divisions of Latvia.

Aizkraukle District 
 Aiviekste Parish
 Aizkraukle
 Bebri Parish
 Daudzese Parish
 Irši Parish
 Jaunjelgava
 Klintaine Parish
 Koknese Parish
 Kurmene Parish
 Mazzalve Parish
 Nereta Parish
 Pilskalne Parish
 Pļaviņas
 Sece Parish
 Sērene Parish
 Skrīveri Parish
 Staburags Parish
 Sunākste Parish
 Valle Parish
 Vietalva Parish
 Zalve Parish

Alūksne District 
 Alūksne
 Ape
 Alsviķi Parish
 Anna Parish
 Gaujiena Parish
 Ilzene Parish
 Jaunalūksne Parish
 Jaunanna Parish
 Jaunlaicene Parish
 Kalncempji Parish
 Liepna Parish
 Maliena Parish
 Mālupe Parish
 Mārkalne Parish
 Pededze Parish
 Trapene Parish
 Veclaicene Parish
 Vireši Parish
 Zeltiņi Parish
 Ziemeri Parish

Balvi District 
 Baltinava Parish
 Balvi
 Balvi Parish
 Bērzkalne Parish
 Bērzpils Parish
 Briežuciems Parish
 Krišjāņi Parish
 Kubuli Parish
 Kuprava Parish
 Lazdukalns Parish
 Lazduleja Parish
 Medņeva Parish
 Rugāji Parish
 Susāji Parish
 Šķilbēni Parish
 Tilža Parish
 Vectilža Parish
 Vecumi Parish
 Viļaka
 Vīksna Parish
 Žīguri Parish

Bauska District 
 Bauska
 Bārbele Parish
 Brunava Parish
 Ceraukste Parish
 Code Parish
 Dāviņi Parish
 Gailīši Parish
 Iecava Municipality
 Īslīce Parish
 Mežotne Parish
 Rundāle Parish
 Skaistkalne Parish
 Stelpe Parish
 Svitene Parish
 Vecsaule Parish
 Vecumnieki Parish
 Viesturi Parish

Cēsis District 
 Amata Municipality
 Cēsis
 Drusti Parish
 Dzērbene Parish
 Ineši Parish
 Jaunpiebalga Parish
 Kaive Parish
 Liepa Parish
 Līgatne
 Līgatne Parish
 Mārsnēni Parish
 Nītaure Parish
 Priekuļi Parish
 Raiskums Parish
 Stalbe Parish
 Straupe Parish
 Rauna Parish
 Skujene Parish
 Taurene Parish
 Vaive Parish
 Vecpiebalga Parish
 Veselava Parish
 Zaube Parish
 Zosēni Parish

Daugavpils District 
 Ambeļi Parish
 Biķernieki Parish
 Demene Parish
 Dubna Parish
 Dviete Parish
 Eglaine Parish
 Ilūkste
 Ilūkste Municipality
 Kalkūne Parish
 Kalupe Parish
 Laucesa Parish
 Līksna Parish
 Maļinova Parish
 Medumi Parish
 Naujene Parish
 Nīcgale Parish
 Saliena Parish
 Skrudaliena Parish
 Subate
 Svente Parish
 Tabore Parish
 Vabole Parish
 Vecsaliena Parish
 Višķi Parish

Dobele District 
 Annenieki Parish
 Auce
 Auri Parish
 Bēne Parish
 Bērze Parish
 Biksti Parish
 Dobele
 Dobele Parish
 Īle Parish
 Jaunbērze Parish
 Krimūna Parish
 Lielauce Parish
 Naudīte Parish
 Penkule Parish
 Tērvete Municipality
 Ukri Parish
 Vītiņi Parish
 Zebrene Parish

Gulbene District 
 Beļava Parish
 Dauksti Parish
 Druviena Parish
 Galgauska Parish
 Gulbene
 Litene Parish
 Lizums Parish
 Līgo Parish
 Lejasciems Parish
 Jaungulbene Parish
 Stāmeriena Parish
 Ranka Parish
 Stradi Parish
 Tirza Parish

Jēkabpils District 
 Aknīste
 Asare Parish
 Atašiene Parish
 Ābeļi Parish
 Dignāja Parish
 Dunava Parish
 Elkšņi Parish
 Gārsene Parish
 Jēkabpils
 Kalna Parish
 Krustpils Parish
 Kūkas Parish
 Leimaņi Parish
 Mežāre Parish
 Rite Parish
 Rubene Parish
 Sala Parish
 Sauka Parish
 Sēlpils Parish
 Varieši Parish
 Viesīte
 Vīpe Parish
 Zasa Parish

Jelgava District 
 Eleja Parish
 Glūda Parish
 Jaunsvirlauka Parish
 Kalnciems
 Lielplatone Parish
 Līvbērze Parish
 Ozolnieki Municipality
 Platone Parish
 Sesava Parish
 Sidrabene Parish
 Svēte Parish
 Valgunde Municipality
 Vilce Parish
 Vircava Parish
 Zaļenieki Parish

Krāslava District 
 Andrupene Parish
 Andzeļi Parish
 Asūne Parish
 Auleja Parish
 Bērziņi Parish
 Dagda
 Dagda Parish
 Ezernieki Parish
 Grāveri Parish
 Indra Parish
 Izvalta Parish
 Kalnieši Parish
 Kaplava Parish
 Kastuļina Parish
 Kombuļi Parish
 Konstantinova Parish
 Krāslava
 Krāslava Municipality
 Ķepova Parish
 Piedruja Parish
 Robežnieki Parish
 Skaista Parish
 Svariņi Parish
 Šķaune Parish
 Šķeltova Parish
 Ūdrīši Parish

Kuldīga District 
 Alsunga Parish
 Ēdole Parish
 Gudenieki Parish
 Īvande Parish
 Kabile Parish
 Kuldīga
 Kurmāle Parish
 Laidi Parish
 Nīkrāce Parish
 Padure Parish
 Pelči Parish
 Raņķi Parish
 Renda Parish
 Rudbārži Parish
 Rumba Parish
 Skrunda
 Skrunda Parish
 Snēpele Parish
 Turlava Parish
 Vārme Parish

Liepāja District 
 Aizpute
 Aizpute Parish
 Bārta Parish
 Bunka Parish
 Cīrava Parish
 Dunalka Parish
 Dunika Parish
 Durbe
 Durbe Municipality
 Embūte Parish
 Gavieze Parish
 Gramzda Parish
 Grobiņa
 Grobiņa Parish
 Kalēti Parish
 Kalvene Parish
 Kazdanga Parish
 Laža Parish
 Medze Parish
 Nīca Parish
 Otaņķi Parish
 Pāvilosta
 Priekule
 Priekule Parish
 Rucava Parish
 Saka Municipality
 Saka Parish
 Vaiņode Parish
 Vecpils Parish
 Vērgale Parish
 Virga Parish

Limbaži District 
 Ainaži
 Aloja
 Braslava Parish
 Brīvzemnieki Parish
 Katvari Parish
 Lēdurga Parish
 Liepupe Parish
 Limbaži
 Limbaži Parish
 Pāle Parish
 Salacgrīva
 Skulte Parish
 Staicele
 Vidriži Parish
 Viļķene Parish
 Umurga Parish

Ludza District 
 Blonti Parish
 Briģi Parish
 Cibla Municipality
 Cirma Parish
 Goliševa Parish
 Isnauda Parish
 Istra Parish
 Kārsava
 Lauderi Parish
 Ludza
 Malnava Parish
 Mežvidi Parish
 Mērdzene Parish
 Nirza Parish
 Ņukši Parish
 Pasiene Parish
 Pilda Parish
 Pureņi Parish
 Pušmucova Parish
 Rundēni Parish
 Salnava Parish
 Zilupe
 Zilupe Municipality
 Zvirgzdene Parish

Madona District 
 Arona Parish
 Barkava Parish
 Bērzaune Parish
 Cesvaine
 Dzelzava Parish
 Ērgļi Municipality
 Kalsnava Parish
 Lazdona Parish
 Ļaudona Parish
 Liezēre Parish
 Lubāna
 Lubāna Municipality
 Madona
 Mārciena Parish
 Mētriena Parish
 Murmastiene Parish
 Ošupe Parish
 Prauliena Parish
 Sarkaņi Parish
 Varakļāni
 Varakļāni Parish
 Vestiena Parish

Ogre District 
 Birzgale Parish
 Ikšķile
 Ikšķile Municipality
 Jumprava Parish
 Krape Parish
 Ķegums
 Ķegums Municipality
 Ķeipene Parish
 Laubere Parish
 Lēdmane Parish
 Lielvārde
 Lielvārde Municipality
 Madliena Parish
 Mazozoli Parish
 Meņģele Parish
 Ogre
 Ogre Municipality
 Suntaži Parish
 Taurupe Parish

Preiļi District 
 Aglona Parish
 Jersika Parish
 Līvāni
 Līvāni Municipality
 Pelēči Parish
 Preiļi
 Preiļi Municipality
 Riebiņi Municipality
 Rudzāti Parish
 Sauna Parish
 Sutri Parish
 Vārkava Parish
 Vārkava Municipality

Rēzekne District 
 Audriņi Parish
 Bērzgale Parish
 Čornaja Parish
 Dekšāres Parish
 Dricāni Parish
 Feimaņi Parish
 Gaigalava Parish
 Griškāni Parish
 Ilzeskalns Parish
 Kantinieki Parish
 Kaunata Parish
 Lendži Parish
 Lūznava Parish
 Malta Parish
 Mākoņkalns Parish
 Nagļi Parish
 Nautrēni Parish
 Ozolaine Parish
 Ozolmuiža Parish
 Puša Parish
 Rikava Parish
 Sakstagals Parish
 Silmala Parish
 Sokolki Parish
 Stoļerova Parish
 Strūžāni Parish
 Verēmi Parish
 Viļāni
 Viļāni Parish

Riga District 
 Ādaži Municipality
 Allaži Parish
 Babīte Parish
 Baldone
 Baloži
 Carnikava Municipality
 Daugmale Parish
 Garkalne Municipality
 Inčukalns Municipality
 Krimulda Parish
 Ķekava Parish
 Mālpils Parish
 Mārupe Parish
 Olaine
 Olaine Parish
 Ropaži Municipality
 Sala Parish
 Salaspils
 Salaspils Municipality
 Saulkrasti
 Sēja Municipality
 Sigulda
 Sigulda Municipality
 Stopiņi Municipality
 Vangaži

Saldus District 
 Brocēni
 Brocēni Municipality
 Ezere Parish
 Gaiķi Parish
 Jaunauce Parish
 Jaunlutriņi Parish
 Kursīši Parish
 Lutriņi Parish
 Nīgrande Parish
 Novadnieki Parish
 Pampāļi Parish
 Ruba Parish
 Saldus
 Saldus Parish
 Šķēde Parish
 Vadakste Parish
 Zaņa Parish
 Zirņi Parish
 Zvārde Parish

Talsi District 
 Balgale Parish
 Dundaga Parish
 Ģibuļi Parish
 Īve Parish
 Kolka Parish
 Ķūļciems Parish
 Laidze Parish
 Lauciene Parish
 Lībagi Parish
 Lube Parish
 Mērsrags Parish
 Roja Parish
 Sabile Municipality
 Stende
 Strazde Parish
 Talsi
 Valdemārpils
 Valdgale Parish
 Vandzene Parish
 Virbi Parish

Tukums District 
 Degole Parish
 Džūkste Parish
 Engure Parish
 Irlava Parish
 Jaunpils Parish
 Jaunsāti Parish
 Kandava
 Kandava Municipality
 Lapmežciems Municipality
 Lestene Parish
 Pūre Parish
 Sēme Parish
 Slampe Parish
 Smārde Parish
 Tukums
 Tume Parish
 Vāne Parish
 Viesati Parish
 Zante Parish
 Zentene Parish

Valka District 
 Bilska Parish
 Blome Parish
 Branti Parish
 Ērģeme Parish
 Ēvele Parish
 Grundzāle Parish
 Jērcēni Parish
 Kārķi Parish
 Launkalne Parish
 Palsmane Parish
 Plāņi Parish
 Seda
 Smiltene
 Smiltene Parish
 Strenči
 Trikāta Parish
 Valka
 Valka Parish
 Variņi Parish
 Vijciems Parish
 Zvārtava Parish

Valmiera District 
 Bērzaine Parish
 Brenguļi Parish
 Burtnieki Parish
 Burtnieki Municipality
 Dikļi Parish
 Ipiķi Parish
 Jeri Parish
 Kauguri Parish
 Kocēni Parish
 Ķoņi Parish
 Lode Parish
 Mazsalaca
 Naukšēni Parish
 Ramata Parish
 Rencēni Parish
 Rūjiena
 Sēļi Parish
 Skaņkalne Parish
 Vaidava Parish
 Valmiera
 Valmiera Parish
 Vilpulka Parish
 Zilākalns Parish

Ventspils District 
 Ance Parish
 Jūrkalne Parish
 Piltene
 Pope Parish
 Puze Parish
 Tārgale Parish
 Ugāle Parish
 Usma Parish
 Užava Parish
 Vārve Parish
 Ziras Parish
 Zlēkas Parish

See also
 Districts of Latvia
 Cultural regions of Latvia
 Administrative regions of Latvia

External links
 Statoids

Former subdivisions of Latvia
Latvia geography-related lists